Canadian comedians have been recognized internationally since the 1910s and were embraced as the country sought a national identity distinct from that of Great Britain and the United States. Canadians closely identify with their sense of humour, and working-class Canadians popularly consider comedians, along with singers and musical acts, as the country's cultural best. Canadians are known to value modesty, politeness and social responsibility, and comedians who develop their craft before such audiences become acutely aware of the fine lines of comedy.

Overview

Types of humour
Many Canadian comedians have been influenced by American and British culture and humour. They blend the comic traditions of these cultures with Canadian humour while maintaining an outsider perspective, the latter providing a separation or ironic distance which has allowed for keen observational humour, impressions and parody. Comedy critics have described this as absorbing and adapting a dominant culture.

Dark and fatalistic humour is also used extensively by Canadian comedians. This is generally attributed to the common reference point of the Canadian climate, the dangers of which are well known to comedians who tour the vast and often sparsely populated country. It may be impossible to change one's fate in the face of overwhelming forces, but the comedian allows the audience to use laughter as a coping mechanism.

Social pressures

Domestic audiences traditionally value the collective good over individual freedom of expression, and as a consequence also value politeness and modesty. To overcome the taboo against social criticism, some Canadian comedians will link comedic discontent to group survival. Others will use a character or persona as a comedic mask, a tool which has allowed satire to gain mainstream popularity. Comedic characters with broad appeal are typically low-status, non-threatening, and likeable despite their misbehaviour.

While social pressures cause Canadians to repress their fears and anxieties, comedians expose such through comedic art. Individual audience members externalize their reaction as laughter, publicly displaying their value system. When an audience laughs together it creates consensus at sharing a common worldview. Canadian comedians thus learn to be surrogates, using individual expression to reaffirm the collective while voicing and soothing the audience's troubles.

Industry
Due to limited opportunities in Canada's entertainment industry, most comedians struggle to earn a living. Those who persevere have tended to place importance on artistic freedom, and are more likely to maintain creative control of their work. Some Canadian comedians move to the larger and more lucrative market of the United States, where they are perceived as "seasoned newcomers", having spent years developing their craft outside the notice of Hollywood.

Since 2000, Canadian comedians have been recognized by the Canadian Comedy Awards (CCA), which has bestowed over 350 awards for comedy in live performances, film, television, radio, and Internet media. Television comedy has also been recognized by the Canadian Screen Awards.

Film and broadcast performers are represented by the Alliance of Canadian Cinema, Television and Radio Artists (ACTRA), theatre performers by the Canadian Actors' Equity Association (CAEA), comedy writers by the Writers Guild of Canada (WGC), and stand-up comedians by the Canadian Association of Stand-up Comedians (CASC).

List

Notable Canadian comedians include:

A

Roger Abbott
Raymond Ablack
Aaron Abrams
David Acer
Marty Adams
Matt Alaeddine
Aisha Alfa
Todd Allen
Aba Amuquandoh
Trey Anthony
Nicole Arbour
Will Arnett
Lauren Ash
Brandon Ash-Mohammed
Dan Aykroyd
Peter Aykroyd
Yank Azman

B

Ali Badshah
Ian Bagg
Bob Bainborough
Rupan Bal
Boyd Banks
John Barbour
Irwin Barker
Alexandre Barrette
Michel Barrette
Jay Baruchel
Eric Bauza
Jennifer Baxter
Samantha Bee
Tracey Bell
Ryan Belleville
Paul Bellini
Carolyn Bennett
Vincent Bilodeau
Tricia Black
Ben Blue
Joe Bodolai
Michael Boncoeur
Ian Boothby
Trevor Boris
Pierre Brassard
David Andrew Brent
Mark Breslin
Dave Broadfoot
Lois Bromfield
Valri Bromfield
Martin Bronstein
Claire Brosseau
Aisha Brown
Aurora Browne
Kyle Brownrigg
Sophie Buddle
Mike Bullard
Pat Bullard
Howard Busgang
Ernie Butler
Brent Butt

C

Inga Cadranel
Craig Campbell
Tommy Campbell
John Candy
Bill Carr
Jim Carrey
Maggie Cassella
John Catucci
Michael Cera
Paul Chato
Martha Chaves
Boris Cherniak
Jonas Chernick
Graham Chittenden
Tommy Chong
Michel Choquette
Vince Matthew Chung
Gay Claitman
Carla Collins
Penelope Corrin
Michel Courtemanche
Susan Coyne
Gavin Crawford
Stéphane Crête
Mark Critch
Jonathan Crombie
Neil Crone
Steven Crowder
Katie Crown
Peter Cullen
Seán Cullen
James Cunningham

D

Ola Dada
Roman Danylo
Tracy Dawson
Ivan Decker
Dashan, born Mark Rowswell
Gerry Dee
Jason Deline
Eddie Della Siepe
Charles Demers
D.J. Demers
Darrell Dennis
Yvon Deschamps
Seán Devlin
Chris Diamantopoulos
J.R. Digs
Debra DiGiovanni
Dini Dimakos
Melissa DiMarco
David Dineen-Porter
Jon Dore
Ryan Doucette
Zabrina Douglas
Harry Doupe
Nigel Downer
Jo-Anna Downey
André Ducharme
Rick Ducommun
Jack Duffy
Robin Duke
Steve Dylan

E

Sam Easton
Derek Edwards
Ophira Eisenberg
Laurie Elliott
Lorne Elliott
Anke Engelke
Ennis Esmer
Fred Ewanuick

F

Darrell Faria
Anthony Q. Farrell
Mark Farrell
Marypat Farrell
Scott Faulconbridge
Don Ferguson
Nathan Fielder
Jebb Fink
Chris Finn
Joe Flaherty
Dave Foley
Mark Forward
Heidi Foss
Glen Foster
Michael J. Fox
Kevin Foxx
Stewart Francis
Matt Frewer
Ajay Fry

G

André-Philippe Gagnon
Mayce Galoni
Holly Gauthier-Frankel
Kevin Gillese
Courtney Gilmour
Nadia Giosia
Stephen Kramer Glickman
Shirley Gnome
Amy Goodmurphy
Luba Goy
Janet van de Graaf
Todd Graham
Brooks Gray
David Granirer
Deven Green
Rick Green
Tom Green
Kathy Greenwood
Adam Growe

H

Kristeen von Hagen
Dean Haglund
Geri Hall
Barbara Hamilton
Allana Harkin
Don Harron
Jonny Harris
Phil Hartman
Ellie Harvie
Ali Hassan
Dakota Ray Hebert
John Hemphill
Ed Hill
Matt Hill
Darryl Hinds
Karen Hines
Norm Hiscock
Shawn Hitchins
Jessica Holmes
Jeremy Hotz
Kenny Hotz
Louis-José Houde
Patrick Huard
Bruce Hunter
Emma Hunter

I

Jennifer Irwin
Steve Ivings

J

Sabrina Jalees
Ron James
Becky Johnson
Andrea Jin
Andy Jones
Cathy Jones
Daryn Jones
Jason Jones
Jenny Jones
Rick Jones
Ron Josol

K

Anthony Kavanagh
Edward Kay
Graham Kay
Peter Kelamis
Susan Kent
Steven Joel Kerzner, creator of Ed the Sock
Deborah Kimmett
Simon King
Paul Kligman
Rebecca Kohler
Elvira Kurt

L

Kris LaBelle
Jon Lajoie
Jeremy Lalonde
Maurice LaMarche
Lisa Lambert
Mado Lamotte
Laura Landauer
Bruno Landry
Murray Langston,  The Unknown Comic
Jean Lapointe
Gilles Latulippe
Michel Lauzière
Craig Lauzon
Tony Law
Chas Lawther
Patrick Ledwell
Paul Sun-Hyung Lee
Claude Legault
Julie Lemieux
Sylvia Lennick
Gaston Leroux
Guy A. Lepage
Caroline Lesley
Dan Lett
Dan Levy
Eugene Levy
Alan Shane Lewis
Natalie Lisinska
Mark Little
Rich Little
Kayla Lorette
Gilson Lubin
Marla Lukofsky
Doris Lussier
Brittany Lyseng

M

Bette MacDonald
Mike MacDonald
Norm Macdonald
Shane MacDougall
Cory Mack
Meredith MacNeill
Michael Magee
Bobby Mair
Shaun Majumder
Greg Malone
Jay Malone
Howie Mandel
Dylan Mandlsohn
Chanty Marostica
Andrea Martin
Bob Martin
Mae Martin
Boman "Bomanizer" Martinez-Reid
Paul Mather
Amy Matysio
Tim McAuliffe
Peter McBain
Trent McClellan
Jordan McCloskey
Kelly McCormack
Bruce McCulloch
Stuart McLean
Drew McCreadie
Kevin McDonald
Wade McElwain
Jeff McEnery
Bonnie McFarlane
Kathleen McGee
Debra McGrath
Stacey McGunnigle
Terry McGurrin
Don McKellar
Patrick McKenna
Duncan McKenzie
Mark McKinney
Ryan McMahon
Wendel Meldrum
Mark Meer
Rick Mercer
Claudine Mercier
Jean-François Mercier
Lisa Merchant
Dave Merheje
Darcy Michael
Lorne Michaels
Dominique Michel
Gabrielle Miller
Rick Miller
Colin Mochrie
Alice Moran
Doug Morency
Rick Moranis
John Morgan
Jordi Morgan
Maynard Morrison
Kirby Morrow
James Mullinger
Mike Myers

N

Briane Nasimok
Zarqa Nawaz
Nick Nemeroff
Phil Nichol
Leslie Nielsen
Rebecca Northan
Alex Nussbaum
Dave Nystrom

O

Catherine O'Hara
Paul O'Sullivan
Peter Oldring
Rose Ouellette
Chris Owens

P

Candy Palmater
Laurent Paquin
Ron Pardo
Alan Park
Pardis Parker
Steve Patterson
Teresa Pavlinek
Nikki Payne
Christina Pazsitzky
Gary Pearson
Ron Pederson
Keith Pedro
Renee Percy
Perry Perlmutar
Matthew Perry
François Pérusse
Russell Peters
Eric Peterson
Martin Petit
Kathleen Phillips
Andrew Phung
Andrew Pifko
Jackie Pirico
Nestor Pistor
Sarah Polley
Ann Pornel
Tim Progosh

Q
Quick Dick McDick

R

Paul Rabliauskas
Rosemary Radcliffe
Lara Rae
Simon Rakoff
Aaron Read
Dan Redican
Jus Reign
Ryan Reynolds
Nick Reynoldson
Caroline Rhea
Spencer Rice
Edward Riche
Jennifer Robertson
Nancy Robertson
Kenny Robinson
Seth Rogen
Darrin Rose
Evany Rosen
Jamillah Ross
Stéphane Rousseau
Stéphane E. Roy
Les Rubie
Mag Ruffman
Katherine Ryan
Richard Ryder

S

Ed Sahely
Mort Sahl
Tabitha St. Germain
Josh Saltzman
Sugar Sammy
Jacob Samuel
Jay Sankey
Will Sasso
Leo Scherman
Ken Scott
Derek Seguin
Jeff Seymour
Tommy Sexton
Sandra Shamas
Steven Shehori
Martin Short
Frank Shuster
Kris Siddiqi
Erica Sigurdson
Arthur Simeon
Tim Sims
Lilly Singh
Ian Sirota
Richard Z. Sirois
Lee Smart
DeAnne Smith
Morag Smith
Steve Smith
Naomi Snieckus
Snook
Ron Sparks
Winston Spear
Tom Stade
Tim Steeves
David Steinberg
Gavin Stephens
Ryan Stiles
Raymond Storey
Janine Sutto

T

Gordie Tapp
Carolyn Taylor
Alan Thicke
Dave Thomas
Greg Thomey
Scott Thompson
Pat Thornton
Jacob Tierney
Steph Tolev
Jackie Torrens
Jonathan Torrens
Angelo Tsarouchas
Eric Tunney

V

Billy Van
Taz VanRassel
Michael Venus
Ron Vaudry
Kevin Vidal

W

Mary Walsh
Dave Ward
Mike Ward
Morgan Waters
Matt Watts
Johnny Wayne
Dave Weasel
George Westerholm
Jennifer Whalen
Jason John Whitehead
Peter Wildman
Elyse Willems
Harland Williams
Paul K. Willis
Mike Wilmot
Jonathan Wilson
K. Trevor Wilson
Mark Wilson
John Wing, Jr.
Daniel Woodrow
Glenn Wool
Matt Wright

Y

Scott Yaphe
Alan Young
Fraser Young
Andrew Younghusband
Hannan Younis

Z
Pete Zedlacher

Duos

Bowser and Blue
Crampe en masse
Double Exposure
MacLean & MacLean
Bob and Doug McKenzie
Life of a Craphead
Morro and Jasp
Mump and Smoot
The Ryan and Amy Show
Smith & Smith
The Sufferettes
Wayne and Shuster

Troupes

The Arrogant Worms
The B-Girlz
Baroness von Sketch Show
The Bobroom
The Chumps
CODCO
Die-Nasty
The Frantics
Hot Thespian Action
IFHT
The Kids in the Hall
The Minnesota Wrecking Crew
Mostly Water Theatre
Picnicface
Rapid Fire Theatre
Rock et Belles Oreilles
Royal Canadian Air Farce
The Second City
The Sketchersons
TallBoyz
Three Dead Trolls in a Baggie
The Vestibules
Women Fully Clothed
Les Zapartistes

See also

Canadian humour
List of comedians
List of Quebec comedians
List of Canadian stand-up comedians

Footnotes

Notes

References

Comedians
Canadian